World Without Tears is the seventh studio album by American singer-songwriter Lucinda Williams, released on April 8, 2003, by Lost Highway Records. The album debuted at No. 18 on the Billboard 200, selling 54,000 copies in its first week. By 2008, it had sold 415,000 copies in the U.S.

The album was a widespread critical and commercial success, and earned Williams two Grammy Award nominations in 2004: Best Contemporary Folk Album and Best Female Rock Vocal Performance for the track "Righteously".

Critical reception

World Without Tears was met with widespread critical acclaim. At Metacritic, which assigns a weighted average rating out of 100 to reviews from mainstream publications, the album received an average score of 87, based on 18 reviews. Spin magazine's Robert Levine believed Williams had returned to "the painful sensuality of the specific" on World Without Tears, while Will Hermes from Entertainment Weekly said the "profoundly carnal" record sounded "noisier and randier" than 2001's Essence. Robert Hilburn deemed it "a rock 'n' roll workout" in his review for the Los Angeles Times, writing that its edgiest songs sounded "close to the raw, disoriented feel" of the Rolling Stones' 1972 album Exile on Main St. entertainment.ies review called it "dark, sleazy and impeccably rock'n'roll" while declaring Williams was "making some of the most essential roots-rock music around."

According to music essayist Kathryn Jones, World Without Tears found Williams continuing her Americana, alternative, and folk-rock sounds on songs that reflected her life since moving from Nashville to Los Angeles. In The Village Voice, Robert Christgau said while the songs were merely "pretty good" rather than "great," Williams compensated with "lowdown, dirty, smoky" music that relied on grooves and riffs. He compared it to a Sue Foley album but with better lyrics, particularly on "Those Three Days" and "Sweet Side." Rolling Stone journalist Karen Schoemer was less impressed. She praised the music's "gorgeous amalgams of country, blues and Southern rock," but was disappointed in how relentlessly bleak the lyrics were, finding them lacking her past work's "wounded innocence" and "sweetness."

Awards

Track listing
All songs written by Lucinda Williams.
"Fruits of My Labor" – 4:41
"Righteously" – 4:36
"Ventura" – 4:37
"Real Live Bleeding Fingers and Broken Guitar Strings" – 4:40
"Overtime" – 3:52
"Those Three Days" – 4:53
"Atonement" – 5:47
"Sweet Side" – 3:34
"Minneapolis" – 4:03
"People Talkin'" – 5:05
"American Dream" – 4:30
"World Without Tears" – 4:11
"Words Fell" – 4:11

Personnel
 Lucinda Williams – vocals, acoustic and electric guitars
 Doug Pettibone  – electric guitars, harmonies, mandolin ("People Talkin")
 Taras Prodaniuk  – bass, harmonies
 Jim Christie  –  drums, wurlitzer ("American Dream"), vox organ ("Ventura", "Minneapolis")

Charts

References

External links 
 World Without Tears at Acclaimed Music (list of accolades)
 
Lucinda Williams Official Website

Lucinda Williams albums
2003 albums
Lost Highway Records albums